The  was an electric multiple unit (EMU) train type introduced in February 1984 by Japanese National Railways (JNR), and later operated by East Japan Railway Company (JR East) and Kyushu Railway Company (JR Kyushu) on local services in Japan. They were converted from former 581/583 series sleeping car EMUs.

Operations
12 4-car 715-0 series sets converted from former 581 series EMU cars were introduced from February 1984 on Nagasaki Main Line and Sasebo Line local services in Kyushu alongside new 713 series EMUs.

15 4-car 715-1000 series sets converted from former 581/583 series EMU cars were introduced from March 1985 on Tōhoku Main Line local services in the Sendai area.

Formations

715-0 series

The 12 JR Kyushu 4-car sets based at Minami-Fukuoka Depot were formed as shown below. Sets NM101–110 had a KuHa 715-100 converted cab car at one end, while sets NM111–112 had converted cab cars at both ends.

Sets NM101–110

Sets NM111–112

The MoHa 714 cars were each fitted with one pantograph.

715-1000 series

The 15 JR East 4-car sets (N1–15) based at Sendai Depot were formed as follows.

The MoHa 714 cars were each fitted with one pantograph.

Interior

Rebuilding
The sets were rebuilt from surplus former 581/583 series EMU cars at JNR factories in Tsuchisaki (Akita), Kōriyama (Fukushima), Mattō (Ishikawa), and Kokura (Kitakyūshū). Rebuilding work involved removing the upper sleeper berths, adding longitudinal bench seating at the ends of cars, increasing the number of doorways, reducing the number of toilets and washing areas, and the addition of slab-front cab ends to some former intermediate cars.

715-0 series

715-1000 series

History
The JR East 715-1000 series sets were withdrawn from revenue service on 13 March 1998.

The remaining JR Kyushu 715-0 series sets were finally withdrawn from service on 26 March 1998.

Preserved examples

KuHa 715-1 is preserved at the Kyushu Railway History Museum in Kitakyushu, restored cosmetically to its original identity of KuHaNe 581-8.

See also
 419 series, similar EMU used in the Hokuriku region of Japan

References

Electric multiple units of Japan
East Japan Railway Company
Kyushu Railway Company
Train-related introductions in 1984
20 kV AC multiple units